The Nelson Hummingbird PG-185B is an American, tandem two seat, mid-wing motor glider that was developed by Nelson Aircraft after discontinuing the Nelson Dragonfly.

Design and development

In 1949, Nelson began the design of another self-launching glider, but this time, he teamed-up with Harry Perl and Don Mitchell. They called this new design the Hummingbird.

Introduced in 1953, the Hummingbird was an attempt to improve upon the marginal performance of the Dragonfly, of which only seven were produced.
The resulting design is a mid-wing glider built predominantly from wood, with the wing leading edge filled with styrofoam and doped aircraft fabric used on the aft portion of the wing, the tail and the rudder. After the first two were completed the remainder were built from metal in place of wood.

The design features an all-flying stabilator with an anti-servo tab, spoilers on the wing's top surface and dive brakes on the bottom. The Nelson H-59 4-cylinder engine was mounted on a retractable mast aft of the bubble canopy. The aircraft has two wheels in tandem, the front being steerable and connected to the rudder pedals.

The design was not type certified, and the seven built were registered under the Experimental - Racing - Exhibition category. Nelson later sold the rights to the aircraft and the engine to Charles Rhoades of Naples, Florida.

Operational history

In March 2011 there were still five registered in the US, two of which had been transferred to the National Soaring Museum.

A gliderport in Livermore, California was named "Hummingbird Haven" as several of the craft were based there.

Aircraft on display
Golden Age Flight Museum
Hiller Aviation Museum
National Soaring Museum - 2
National Air and Space Museum
US Southwest Soaring Museum

Specifications (PG-185B)

See also

References

1950s United States sailplanes
Nelson aircraft
Motor gliders
Single-engined pusher aircraft
Mid-wing aircraft